4276 Clifford, provisional designation is an asteroid and sizable Mars-crosser from the innermost region of the asteroid belt, approximately 4.4 kilometers in diameter. It  was discovered on 2 December 1981, by American astronomers Edward Bowell at Lowell Observatory in Flagstaff, United States. The asteroid was named in honor of astronomer and writer Clifford Cunningham.

Orbit and classification 

Clifford is a member of the group of main-belt asteroids known as Mars-crosser asteroids, specifically, it is listed as an Outer-grazer. It orbits the Sun at a distance of 1.6–2.4 AU once every 2 years and 10 months (1,040 days). Its orbit has an eccentricity of 0.20 and an inclination of 21° with respect to the ecliptic.

Physical characteristics 

In the SMASS classification, Clifford is a Cb-type, which transitions from the carbonaceous C-type asteroids to the rare B-type asteroids.

According to the survey carried out by NASA's Wide-field Infrared Survey Explorer with its subsequent NEOWISE mission, Clifford measures 4.441 kilometers in diameter and its surface has an albedo of 0.142. As of 2017, no rotational lightcurve has been obtained of Clifford. Its rotation period and shape remain unknown.

Naming 

This minor planet was named after Canadian astronomer and author Clifford Cunningham, who is best known for his 1988 published book Introduction to Asteroids and 5-volume history of asteroid studies published by Springer in 2016 and 2017. He received his PhD in the history of astronomy in 2015. His astronomical work includes astrometry and photometry of minor planets. The approved naming citation was published by the Minor Planet Center on 10 April 1990.

References

External links 
 Asteroid Lightcurve Database (LCDB), query form (info )
 Dictionary of Minor Planet Names, Google books
 Asteroids and comets rotation curves, CdR – Observatoire de Genève, Raoul Behrend
 Discovery Circumstances: Numbered Minor Planets (1)–(5000) – Minor Planet Center
 
 

004276
Discoveries by Edward L. G. Bowell
004276
Named minor planets
004276
19811202